Haijian 84 is a China Marine Surveillance (CMS) ship in the 8th Marine Surveillance Flotilla of the South China Sea Fleet. She was commissioned on May 8, 2011 at the Changzhou port of the 8th Marine Surveillance Flotilla's base. Her completion signified the completion of the second ship building plan of CMS as well.

References

Ships of the China Marine Surveillance